Bouretidae is an extinct family of grasshoppers in the order Orthoptera. There is one genus, Bouretia, in Bouretidae, with fossils found in Brazil.

References

Caelifera
Prehistoric insect families